The Vanished is a 2005 short film directed by Nathan S. Ross and starring Nick Tate, Tom Tate, and Kit McDee.

Awards
Tom Tate won the 2006 Queensland New Filmmakers Awards for Best Actor.

External links

Official Website
Watch The Vanished

2005 films
2005 short films
Australian short films
Australian independent films
2000s English-language films
2005 independent films
2000s Australian films